The 1946 All-Big Six Conference football team consists of American football players chosen by the Associated Press (AP) and the United Press (UP) as the best players at each position among teams playing in the Big Six Conference during the 1946 college football season. .

All-Big Six selections

Backs
 Ray Evans, Kansas (AP-1, UP-1)
 Joe Golding, Oklahoma (AP-1, UP-1)
 Loyd Brinkman, Missouri (AP-1, UP-1)
 Thomas Novak, Nebraska (AP-1, UP-2)
 Dick Hutton, Nebraska (AP-2, UP-1)
 Sam Vacanti, Nebraska (AP-2, UP-2)
 Bob Hopkins, Missouri (AP-2, UP-2)
 Jack Mitchell, Oklahoma (AP-2, UP-2)
 Frank Pattee, Kansas (UP-3)
 Dick Howard, Iowa State (UP-3)
 Bud French, Kansas (UP-3)
 Eddy Davis, Oklahoma (UP-3)

Ends
 Roland Oakes, Missouri (AP-1, UP-1)
 Otto Schnellbacher, Kansas (AP-1, UP-1)
 David Schmidt, Kansas (AP-2, UP-2)
 Jim  Tyree, Oklahoma (AP-2, UP-3)
 Dean Laun, Iowa State (UP-2)
 Marshall Shurnas, Missouri (UP-3)

Tackles
 Wade Walker, Oklahoma (AP-1, UP-1)
 Jim Kekeris, Missouri (AP-1, UP-1)
 Carl Samuelson, Nebraska (AP-2, UP-2)
 Homer Paine, Oklahoma (AP-2, UP-2)
 Huck Heath, Kansas State (UP-3)
 Don Ettinger, Kansas (UP-3)

Guards
 Plato Andros, Oklahoma (AP-1, UP-1)
 Don Fambrough, Kansas (AP-1, UP-1)
 Ed Schwartzkopf, Nebraska (AP-2, UP-3)
 Buddy Burris, Oklahoma (AP-2, UP-2)
 Edgar McNeil, Kansas State (UP-2)
 Verlie Abrams, Missouri (UP-3)

Centers
 John Rapacz, Oklahoma (AP-1, UP-1)
 Ralph Stewart, Missouri (AP-2, UP-2)
 Joe Partington, Nebraska (UP-3)

Key

See also
1946 College Football All-America Team

References

All-Big Six Conference football team
All-Big Eight Conference football teams